The 2003–04 Women's National Cricket League season was the eighth season of the Women's National Cricket League, the women's domestic limited overs cricket competition in Australia. The tournament started on 22 November 2003 and finished on 2 February 2004. New South Wales Breakers won the tournament for the seventh time after finishing second on the ladder at the conclusion of the group stage and beating defending champions Victorian Spirit by two games to one in the finals series.

Ladder

Fixtures

1st final

2nd final

3rd final

Statistics

Highest totals

Most runs

Most wickets

References

 
Women's National Cricket League seasons
 
Women's National Cricket League